is a Japanese actor.

Career
Osawa starred in the 2002 film Filament and the 2007 film Midnight Eagle. He has also appeared in films such as Masayuki Suo's A Terminal Trust and Takashi Miike's Shield of Straw.

The Newport Beach Film Festival in Newport Beach, CA, screened Osawa's film Wolf Children on April 27, 2013.

In mid-2018, he is playing the Kralahome in the West End revival of The King and I.

Filmography

Film

Television

Games
 Professor Layton and the Diabolical Box (2007) as Anton Herzen (voice)

References

External links
  
 
 

1968 births
Japanese male film actors
Living people
People from Tokyo